All-for-nots, produced by Michael Eisner, is a web TV mockumentary-comedy that followed the ups and downs of an indie rock band touring on the road.  The web series was created by Kathleen Grace and Thom Woodley of  Dinosaur Diorama, the co-creators of the popular internet sitcom The Burg.

The show starred Brian Cheng (Larry), Erica Harsch (Shirley), Marielle Heller (Heather), Kevin Johnston (Johnny), Michael Moravek (Caleb), Vanessa Reseland (Farrah), and Thom Woodley (Paul).  The show was directed by Kathleen Grace, and produced by Grace, Woodley, and Melissa Schneider.  Woodley was also the head writer, along with writers Matt Yeager and Andrew Wagner.

The show debuted on March 11, 2008. New episodes were released every Monday online, via Verizon V CAST and cable/satellite HDNet.

Episode list
101. Brooklyn
102. Providence
103. Boston
104. Woodstock
105. State College
106. Philadelphia
107. Jersey City
108. Queens
109. East Village
110. Washington DC
111. Cleveland
112. Chicago
113. St. Mary's
114. Detroit
115. Madison
116. Minneapolis
117. Odessa
118. Kansas City
119. Boulder
120. Cheyenne
121. Salt Lake City
122. Reno
123. Olympic Valley
124. L.A.

External links
 The AllForNots.com
 The All-For-Nots at the Internet Movie Database

References

2008 web series debuts
2000s American documentary television series